Fouée, also known as fouace, is a round, airy bread from the western France (Touraine and Anjou region of the Loire Valley, Poitou, Charente). It looks somewhat similar to pita. It is served with pork rillettes, salted butter and mogettes (white beans).

Not to be confused with another French culinary specialty, called fouace or fouasse, from the Southern France (Rouergue, Aveyron and Haute-Auvergne). Fouace is a traditional pastry with a light-yellow crumb, a fine crust, often strewn with sugar grains. It is usually presented in the shape of a crown or bun and it is well known for its unique orange blossom flavor. It can be enjoyed for breakfast, aperitif or dessert.

Fouace is a variety of brioche prepared from wheat flour, sourdough, butter, eggs, milk, sugar, orange flower water, and salt.

References

External links
French Wikipedia page for Fouée
French Wikipedia page disambiguating this and related breads
French Wikipedia page for Fouace
Wiktionary page for Fouace

French breads
Loire Valley
Aveyron